James Gallaher (1792-1853), a Presbyterian, was the Chaplain of the United States House of Representatives in 1852.

References

1792 births
1853 deaths
Chaplains of the United States House of Representatives
19th-century American clergy